"Everything in Its Right Place" is a 2000 song by Radiohead.

Everything in Its Right Place may also refer to:

"Everything in Its Right Place" (Fringe), the seventeenth episode of the fourth season of Fringe
"Everything In Its Right Place", the eleventh episode of the fourth season of One Tree Hill